Onch'ŏn County is a county in South P'yŏngan province, North Korea. It is administered as part of Namp'o Special City.

Administrative divisions
Onch'ŏn county is divided into 1 ŭp (town), 5 rodongjagu (workers' districts) and 14 ri (villages):

Transportation
Onch'ŏn county is served by the P'yŏngnam and Ryonggang lines of the Korean State Railway.

References

External links
  Map of Pyongan provinces
  Detailed map

Districts of Nampo
Counties of North Korea